The Ladies' Literary Club also known as Wednesday Literary Club was built as a social club building located at 61 Sheldon Street SE in Grand Rapids, Michigan. It was listed on the National Register of Historic Places in 1971. As of 2019, the building is being renovated into a social event space known as The Lit.

History
In 1869, a group of Grand Rapids women organized a small history class. In 1870, this grew into the Ladies' Literary Association, which was formally organized as an association that year. The Association was influential in opening a public library in the city. In 1882, the group was re-incorporated at the Ladies' Literary Club to promote literary and scientific subjects. The club grew, and in 1887 they decided to construct their own building. The Club purchased a lot and hired local architect William G. Robinson to design a clubhouse. Ground was broken in 1887, and construction was completed by December of that year. Major additions and renovations were completed in 1931.

Major additions and renovations were completed in 1931. In 2005, the club disbanded due to declining membership. In 2006, the remaining members transferred ownership of the building to Calvin College, which made $1 million worth of improvements to the building. The College used the building as a music, theater and entertainment venue. However, in 2014, they decided to sell the building. In 2018, a group of investors purchased the building with the intention of renovating it to become The Lit event space.

Over the years, the club has hosted speeches by Theodore Roosevelt, William Howard Taft, and Woodrow Wilson.

Description
The Ladies' Literary Club is a two-story brick structure with a tall single-story wing attached to the rear housing an auditorium. Bluestone trim is used around the doors and windows, and it has a slate roof. Although the building is substantially brick rather than stone, the design exhibits the massive Richardsonian Romanesque style. The building has French plane and stained glass windows. This includes a Tiffany glass window appraised at $225,000.

References

		
National Register of Historic Places in Kent County, Michigan
Romanesque Revival architecture in Michigan
Buildings and structures completed in 1887